Goose Lake refers to several lakes in close vicinity in Halifax County, Nova Scotia, Canada.

The lakes are located at:
 

Lakes of Nova Scotia